The Coast Guard Bicentennial Unit Commendation was a unit award of the United States Coast Guard which was awarded to all active, reserve, auxiliary, and civilian personnel of the Coast Guard for service from March 1989 to October 1989.

The award was issued only to those whose service up to the issuance date was honorable and it could be issued to members of other services who were assigned to the Coast Guard and served in that period.

Wearing of the ribbon was stipulated to be placed after the Air and Space Organizational Excellence Award and before the Prisoner of War Medal.

One-time award
Established by Commandant of the Coast Guard Admiral Paul A. Yost, Jr. on 2 January 2 1990. The award was issued as a one-time award only that commemorated the founding of the U.S. Coast Guard in 1790, then known as the Revenue Cutter Service.  The Coast Guard Bicentennial Unit Commendation was discontinued for issuance in September 1991, but Coast Guard regulations permit the continued wearing of the decoration on the uniforms of Coast Guard members who have earned it.

References

Bicentennial Unit Commendation
Bicentennial anniversaries
Awards established in 1990
US Coast Guard ribbon symbolism